Danceholic is the fourth studio album by Italian DJ and record producer Benny Benassi. It was released on 15 July 2016, through Ultra Music.

Track listing

Charts

References

2016 albums
Benny Benassi albums
Ultra Records albums